Lagartos Futebol Clube is a Guinea-Bissau football club based in Bambadinca. They currently play in the top domestic Campeonato Nacional da Guiné-Bissau.

Lagartos were finalists in the 2015 Taça Nacional da Guiné Bissau, losing 5–1 to champions Sport Bissau e Benfica.

References

Lagartos